Silvana Pierucci married Perasso  (21 September 1929 – 15 February 2017) was an Italian long jumper who competed at the 1948 Summer Olympics. After her track & field career became a basketball player and participated, with the national team, at the EuroBasket Women 1950.

National titles
She won 7 national championships at senior level.
Italian Athletics Championships
Long jump: 1948, 1949, 1950, 1951
Pentathlon: 1949, 1950 1951

See also
 Italian record progression women's long jump

References

External links
 
 Silvana Pierucci at FIP

1929 births
2017 deaths
Athletes (track and field) at the 1948 Summer Olympics
Italian female long jumpers
Italian female pentathletes
Olympic athletes of Italy
Sportspeople from Genoa
Italian women's basketball players
20th-century Italian women